Nodal Point may refer to:
Nodal point, a cardinal point in optics
Nodal Admissions Point, a location used in UK school admission policy